Enrico Gennari (born 21 January 1977) is an Italian marine biologist who specialises in the study of the great white shark.

Early life and education
Gennari was born in Rome in 1977. He has said that he was intending to study the great white shark from the age of six.

He received a master's degree in Natural Science from the Sapienza University of Rome in February 2004, magna cum laude. His degree thesis was on a vertebral ageing study of Etmopterus spinax, a bottom-dwelling shark typical of the Mediterranean Sea, creating a new technique to "read" very difficult vertebra for the first time.

Gennari took a year break in Ustica, near Sicily, working as a scuba diving instructor, then worked for nine months in 2005, studying the behaviour of white sharks including their night time predatory behaviour. 

Gennari then enrolled at Rhodes University for his PhD study on the thermo physio-ecology of white sharks, under the supervision of Paul Cowley from SAIAB. Meanwhile he established a non-governmental marine research institute focused on marine megafauna, called the Oceans Research Institute. Gennari got his PhD in 2015.

He is the Director of Research at Oceans Research Institute in Mossel Bay, an Honorary Research Associate of the South African Institute for Aquatic Biodiversity (SAIAB), a research associate at the Rhodes University’s Department of Ichthyology and Fisheries Science (DIFS) and Adjunct Senior Researcher within the Institute for Marine and Antarctic Studies, at the University of Tasmania. He is one of the founding members of the South African White Shark Research Group (SAWSRG). he was nominated by the South African Department of Forestry, Fisheries and the Environment for both the Shark Advisory Group and the Marine Mammal Technical Committee for the Top Predator Scientific Working Group. 

He has published 30 peer reviewed papers, including in Nature. He has supervised 3 PhD, 9 MSc and 4 BSc (Hon) students, in collaboration with the University of Pretoria, the University of Cape Town, Rhodes University, Stellenbosch University, University of Tasmania (AUS), University of Brussels (Belgium) and Dalhousie University (Canada).

Television appearances 
 2006 Discovery Channel: After the Attack
 2007 Discovery Channel: Shark Tribe
 2007 National Geographic Channel: Sharkville
 2008: French television show Thalassa (France 3).
 2008: “Predator X” Discovery’s History Channel.
 2008: Oceans Research’s scientist Enrico Gennari interviewed for the BBC     news channel and the  BBC website     about the research that Oceans Research carries on in Mossel Bay and the     possible interaction between water users and white sharks.
 2008: Enrico was interviews for BBC article “How to measure a Great     White's bite” by Jonah Fisher:    http://news.bbc.co.uk/1/hi/world/africa/7759945.stm http://news.bbc.co.uk/2/hi/africa/7759377.stm
2009: “The beauty and the Shark” by Florian Guthknecht, ARD, 1. German Public TV (2009 )
2009: “Orcas: the sea wolves”, producer “Pangolin”, broadcaster “Discovery     Channel”
 2010: Channel Four: Inside Nature's Giants- Episode: The Great White Shark” producer “Windfall”, broadcaster “Channel 4 UK and National Geographic”
 2012: “Shark Wranglers” History Channel
 2015: “The White Shark”. NHK Japanese Broadcasting.
 2021: The CNN’s Inside Africa featured Oceans Research Institute of Mossel Bay as one of the country’s main marine research, conservation and training hub: link

Scientific articles 
 Kock A., Johnson R.L., Bester M.N.,     Compagno L., Cliff G., Dudley S., Gennari E., Griffiths C.L., Kotze D.,     Laroche K., Meyer M.A., Oosthuizen W.H. and Swanson S., 2006. White shark abundance: not a causative factor in     numbers of shark bite incidents. In:     Finding a balance: white shark conservation and recreational safety in the     inshore waters of Cape Town, South Africa. D.C. Nel and T.P. Peschak Eds. WWF South Africa Report Series - 2006/Marine/001
 Gennari E. and Scacco U., 2007. First age and growth estimates in the deep water     shark, Etmopterus spinax (Linnaeus,     1758), by deep coned vertebral analysis. Marine Biology 152 (5): 1207-1214. https://doi.org/10.1007/s00227-007-0769-y
 Johnson R., Bester M.N., Dudley S.,     Oosthuizen W.H., Meÿer M., Hancke L. and Gennari E., 2009. Coastal swimming patterns of white sharks (Carcharodon carcharias) at Mossel     Bay, South Africa. Environmental     Biology of Fish 85: 189-200. https://doi.org/10.1007/s10641-009-9477-4
 Gubili C., Johnson R., Gennari E., Oosthuizen     W.H., Kotze D., Meÿer M., Sims D., Jones C.S., Swanson S. and Noble L.R.,     2009. Concordance of genetic and     fin photo identification in the Great White Shark. Marine Biology 156 (10): 2199–2207. https://doi.org/10.1007/s00227-009-1233-y
 Jewell O.J.D., Wcisel M.A., Gennari     E., Towner A.V., Bester M.N., Johnson R.L., Singh S., 2011. Effects of smart position only (SPOT) tag     deployment on white sharks Carcharodon     carcharias in South Africa. PLoS     ONE 6 (11): e27242. https://doi.org/10.1371/journal.pone.0027242
 Delaney D.G., Johnson R., Bester     M.N. and Gennari E., 2012. Accuracy     of using visual identification of white sharks to estimate residency patterns.     PLoS ONE 7(4): e34753. https://doi.org/10.1371/journal.pone.0034753
 Jewell O.J.D., Johnson R.L.,     Gennari E. and Bester M.N., 2013. Fine     scale movements and activity areas of white sharks (Carcharodon carcharias) in Mossel Bay, South Africa. Environmental Biology of Fish 96: 881–894.     https://doi.org/10.1007/s10641-012-0084-4
 James B.S., Bester M.N., Penry G.S.,     Gennari E. and Elwen S.H., 2015. Abundance and degree of residency of humpback     dolphins Sousa plumbea in Mossel     Bay, South Africa. African Journal     of Marine Science 37 (3): 383-394. https://doi.org/10.2989/1814232x.2015.1083477
 Kempster R.M., Egeberg C.A., Hart     N.S., Ryan L., Chapuis L., Kerr C.C., Schmidt C., Huveneers C., Gennari     E., Yopak K.E., Meeuwig J.J. and Collin S.P., 2016. How close is too close? The effect of a     non-lethal electric shark deterrent on white shark behaviour. PLoS ONE 11(7): e0157717. https://doi.org/10.1371/journal.pone.0157717
 Findlay R., Gennari E., Cantor M. And Tittensor D.P., 2016. How solitary are white sharks: social interactions     or just spatial proximity? Behavioral     Ecology and Sociobiology 70 (10): 1735-1744. https://doi.org/10.1007/s00265-016-2179-y      
 Irion D.T., Noble L.R., Kock A.A.,     Gennari E., Dicken M.L., Hewitt A.M., Towner A.V., Booth A.J., Smale M.J.     and Cliff G., 2017. Pessimistic     assessment of white shark population status in South Africa: Comment on     Andreotti et al. (2016). Marine     Ecology Progress Series (577): 251–25. https://doi.org/10.3354/meps12283
 Ryan L.A., Chapuis L., Hemmi J.M., Collin S.P., McCauley R., Yopak K.E., Gennari E., Huveneers C., Kempster R.M., Kerr C.C., Schmidt C., Egeberg C.A. and Hart N.S., 2018. Effects of auditory and visual stimuli on shark feeding behaviour: the disco effect. Marine Biology 165 (11). https://doi.org/10.1007/s00227-017-3256-0 
 Vermeulen E., Bouveroux T., Plön S., Atkins S., Chivell W., Cockcroft V., Conry D., Gennari E., Hörbst S., James B.S., Kirkman S., Penry G., Pistorius P., Thornton M., Vargas-Fonseca O.A. and Elwen S.H., 2018. Indian Ocean humpback dolphin (Sousa plumbea) movement patterns along the South African coast. Aquatic Conservation: Marine and Freshwater Ecosystems 28:231–24. https://doi.org/10.1002/aqc.2836 
 Maduna S.N., Van Wyk J.H., Da Silva C., Gennari E. and Bester-Van Der Merwe A.E., 2018. Evidence for sperm storage in common smoothhound shark Mustelus mustelus and paternity assessment in a single litter from South Africa. Journal of Fish Biology. https://doi.org/10.1111/jfb.13565 
 Kuguru G., Maduna S., da Silva C., Gennari E., Rhode C. and  Bester-van der Merwe A., 2018. DNA barcoding of chondrichthyans in South African fisheries. Fisheries Research 206: 292–295. https://doi.org/10.1016/j.fishres.2018.05.023 
 Gennari E., Johnson R.L. and Cowley P.D., 2018. Performance and reliability of active acoustic biotelemetry to best track marine pelagic species in temperate coastal waters. Marine Biology 165:128. https://doi.org/10.1007/s00227-018-3384-1 
 Huveneers C., Apps K., Becceri-Garcia E.E., Bruce B., Butcher P.A., Carlisle A., Chapple T., Christiansen H., Cliff G., Curtis T., Daly-Engel T., Dewar H., Dicken M., Domeier M., Duffy C., Ford R., French G., Francis M., Galvan-Magana F., García-Rodríguez E., Gennari E., Graham B., Hayden B., Hoyos-Parilla M., Hussey N.E., Jewell O., Jorgensen S., Kock A., Lowe C., Lyons K., Meyer L.C., Oelofse G., Oñate-González E.C., Oosthuizen H., O'Sullivan J., Ramm K., Skomal G., Sloan S., Smale M., Sosa-Nishizaki O., Sperone E., Tamburin E., Towner A., Wcisel M., Weng K., and Werry J.M., 2018. Future research directions on the ‘elusive’ white shark. Frontiers in Marine Science, section Marine Megafauna https://doi.org/10.3389/fmars.2018.00455 
 Egeberg C.A., Kempster R.M., Hart N.S., Ryan L., Chapuis L., Kerr C.C., Schmidt C., Gennari E., Yopak K.E. and Collin S.P., 2019. Not all electric shark deterrents are made equal: Effects of a commercial electric anklet deterrent on white shark behaviour. PLoS ONE 14 (3): e0212851. https://doi.org/10.1371/journal.pone.0212851
 Chapuis L., Collin S.P., Yopak K.E., McCauley R.D., Kempster R.M., Ryan L.A., Schmidt C., Kerr C.C., Gennari E., Egeberg C.A. and Hart N.S., 2019. The effect of underwater sounds on shark behaviour. Scientific Reports 9(1): 6924. https://doi.org/10.1038/s41598-019-43078-w 
 Morse P., Mole M.A., Bester M.N., Johnson R., Scacco U. and Gennari E., 2019. Cape fur seals (Arctocephalus pusillus pusillus) adjust traversing behaviour with lunar conditions in the high white shark (Carcharodon carcharias) density waters of Mossel Bay, South Africa. Marine Ecology Progress Series 622: 219-230. https://doi.org/10.3354/meps13051
 Queiroz, N., Humphries, N.E., Couto, A., Vedor, M., da Costa, I., Sequeira, A.M.M., Mucientes, G., Santos, A.M., Abascal, F.J., Abercrombie, D.L., Abrantes, K., Acuña-Marrero, D., Afonso, A.S., Afonso, P., Anders, D., Araujo, G., Arauz, R., Bach, P., Barnett, A., Bernal, D., Berumen, M.L., Bessudo Lion, S.,  Bezerra, N.P.A., Blaison, A.V., Block, B.A., Bond, M.E., Bradford, R.W., Braun, C.D., Brooks, E.J., Brooks, A., Brown, J., Bruce, B.D., Byrne, M.E., Campana, S.E., Carlisle, A.B., Chapman, D.D., Chapple, T.K., Chisholm, J., Clarke, C.R., Clua, E.G., Cochran, J.E.M., Crochelet, E.C., Dagorn, L., Daly, R., Devia Cortés, D., Doyle, T.K., Drew, M., Duffy, C.A.J., Erikson, T., Espinoza, E., Ferreira, L.C., Ferretti, F., Filmalter, J.D., Fischer, C.G., Fitzpatrick, R., Fontes, J., Forget, F., Fowler, M., Francis, M.P., Gallagher, A.J., Gennari, E., Goldsworthy, S.D., Gollock, M.J., Green, J.R., Gustafson, J.A., Guttridge, T.L., Guzman, H.M., Hammerschlag, N., Harman, L., Hazin, F.H.V., Heard, M., Hearn, A.R., Holdsworth, J.C., Holmes, B.J., Howey, L.A., Hoyos, M., Hueter, R.E., Hussey, N.E., Huveneers, C., Irion, D.T., Jacoby, D.M.P., Jewell, O.J.D., Johnson, R., Jordan, L.K.B., Jorgensen, S.J., Joyce, W., Keating Daly, C.A., Ketchum, J.T., Klimley, A.P., Kock, A.A., Koen, P., Ladino, F., Lana, F.O., Lea, J.S.E., Llewellyn, F.,  Lyon, W.S., MacDonnell, A., Macena, B.C.L., Marshall, H., McAllister, J.D., McAuley, R., Meÿer, M.A., Morris, J.J., Nelson, E.R., Papastamatiou, Y.P., Patterson, T.A., Peñaherrera-Palma, C., Pepperell, J.G., Pierce, S.J., Poisson, F., Quintero, L.M., Richardson, A., Rogers, P.J., Rohner, C.A., Rowat, D.R.L., Samoilys, M., Semmens, J.M., Sheaves, M., Shillinger, G., Shivji, M., Singh, S., Skomal, G.B., Smale, M.J., Snyders, L.B., Soler, G., Soria, M., Stehfest, K.M., Stevens, J.D., Thorrold, S.R., Tolotti, M.T., Towner, A., Travassos, P, Tyminski, J.P., Vandeperre, F., Vaudo, J.J., Watanabe, Y.Y., Weber, S.B., Wetherbee, B.M., White, T.D., Williams, S., Zárate, P.M., Harcourt, R., Hays, G.C., Meekan, M.G., Thums, M., Irigoien, X., Eguiluz, V.M., Duarte, C.M., Sousa, L.L., Simpson, S.J., Southall, E.J. and Sims, D.W., 2019. Global spatial risk assessment of sharks under the footprint of fisheries. Nature, https://doi.org/10.1038/s41586-019-1444-4
 Lucrezi S., Ellis S. and Gennari E., 2019. A test of causative and moderator effects in human perceptions of sharks, their control and framing. Marine Policy 109: 103687. https://doi.org/10.1016/j.marpol.2019.103687 
 Grusd S.P., Moloney C.L., Distiller G., Watson R.G.A., Cowley P.D. and Gennari E., 2019. Using mark-recapture methods to estimate population size and survival of pyjama sharks Poroderma africanum in Mossel Bay, South Africa. African Journal of Marine Science. https://doi.org/10.2989/1814232X.2019.1670263
 Gennari E., Kock A., Smale M., Towner A., Khan N., Bester L., Johnson R., Fischer C., Meÿer M. and Morse P, 2019. Antibiotic sensitivity of bacterial flora isolated from the oral cavities of live white sharks (Carcharodon carcharias) in South African waters. South African Journal of Science https://doi.org/10.17159/sajs.2019/5972
 Kuguru G., Gennari E., Wintner S., Dicken M.L., Klein J.D., Rhode C. and Bester-van der Merwe A.E., 2019. Spatio-temporal genetic variation of juvenile smooth hammerhead sharks in South Africa. Marine Biology Research.  https://doi.org/10.1080/17451000.2019.1695058
 Dines S.F. and Gennari E., 2019. First observations of white sharks (Carcharodon carcharias) attacking a live humpback whale (Megaptera novaeangliae). Marine and Freshwater Research. https://doi.org/10.1071/MF19291
 Seakamela S.M., Hofmeyr G., Vermeulen E., Meyer M., Olbers J., Dicken M., Thompson G., Gennari E., Atkins S., Neveceralova P., Versfeld D., Penry G., Harris J. and Findlay K., 2020. South African Cetacean Research. IWC Scientific Progress Report 2019
 van Staden M., Gledhill K.S., Gennari E., McCord M., Parkinson M., Watson R., Rhode C. and Bester-van der Merwe A.E., 2020. Microsatellite development and detection of admixture among three sympatric Haploblepharus species (Carcharhiniformes: Scyliorhinidae). Aquatic Conservation: Marine and Freshwater Ecosystems. https://doi.org/10.1002/aqc.3406
 Scarponi V., Gennari E. and Hughes W., 2021. Physiological response to capture stress in endemic Southern African catsharks (Family Scyliorhinidae). Journal of Fish Biology 2021 https://doi.org/10.1111/jfb.14710
 Lucrezi S. and Gennari E., 2021. Perceptions of shark hazard mitigation at beaches implementing lethal and nonlethal shark control programs. Society & Animals no. aop (2021): 1-22. https://doi.org/10.1163/15685306-BJA10046
 Ryan L.A., Slip D.G., Chapuis L., Collin S.P., Gennari E., Hemmi J.M., How M.J., Huveneers C., Peddemors V.M., Tosetto L. and Hart N.S., 2021. A shark's eye view: testing the 'mistaken identity theory' behind shark bites on humans. Journal of the Royal Society Interface. https://doi.org/10.1098/rsif.2021.0533 
 Klein J.D., Asbury T.A., da Silva C., Hull K.L., Dicken M.L., Gennari E., Maduna S. and Bester-van der Merwe A.E., 2021. Shallow genetic divergence and high site fidelity in the common smoothhound shark Mustelus mustelus confirmed by genetic and tag-recapture data. Journal of Fish Biology doi: 10.1111/jfb.14926.

References 

 Oceans Research - Director
 SAIAB Research institute - Scientists
 SHARK - The Great White
 How to measure a Great White's bite
 https://programm.ard.de/TV/Programm/Sender/?sendung=287245774139642

External links
 Oceans Research

1977 births
Living people
Scientists from Rome
Italian marine biologists